Vietnamese Martyrs (Vietnamese: Các Thánh Tử đạo Việt Nam; French: Martyrs du Viêt Nam) or Saint Andrew Dung-Lac and Companions (Vietnamese: Anrê Dũng-Lạc và các bạn tử đạo), also known as the Martyrs of Annam, Martyrs of Tonkin and Cochinchina, Martyrs of Indochina, are saints on the General Roman Calendar who were canonized by Pope John Paul II.  On June 19, 1988, thousands of Overseas Vietnamese worldwide gathered at the Vatican for the Celebration of the Canonization of 117 Vietnamese Martyrs, an event chaired by Monsignor Tran Van Hoai.  Their memorial is on November 24 (although several of these saints have another memorial, having been beatified and on the calendar prior to the canonization of the group).

History
The Vatican estimates the number of Vietnamese martyrs at between 130,000 and 300,000. John Paul II decided to canonize both those whose names are known and unknown, giving them a single feast day.

The Vietnamese Martyrs fall into several groupings, those of the Dominican and Jesuit missionary era of the 18th century and those killed in the politically inspired persecutions of the 19th century. A representative sample of only 117 martyrs—including 96 Vietnamese, 11 Spanish Dominicans, and ten French members of the Paris Foreign Missions Society (Missions Etrangères de Paris (MEP))—were beatified on four separate occasions: 64 by Pope Leo XIII on May 27, 1900; eight by Pope Pius X on May 20, 1906; 20 by Pope Pius X on May 2, 1909; and 25 by Pope Pius XII on April 29, 1951. All 117 of these Vietnamese Martyrs were canonized on June 19, 1988. A young Vietnamese Martyr, Andrew of Phú Yên, was beatified in March 2000, by Pope John Paul II.

The tortures these individuals underwent are considered by the Vatican to be among the worst in the history of Christian martyrdom. The torturers hacked off limbs joint by joint, tore flesh with red hot tongs, and used drugs to enslave the minds of the victims. Christians at the time were branded on the face with the words "tả đạo" (lit. "Left (Sinister) religion") and families and villages which subscribed to Christianity were obliterated.

The letters and example of Théophane Vénard inspired the young Saint Thérèse of Lisieux to volunteer for the Carmelite nunnery at Hanoi, though she ultimately contracted tuberculosis and could not go. In 1865 Vénard's body was transferred to his Congregation's church in Paris, but his head remains in Vietnam.

There are several Catholic parishes in the United States, Canada, and elsewhere dedicated to the Martyrs of Vietnam (Holy Martyrs of Vietnam Parishes), one of which is located in Arlington, Texas, in the Dallas-Fort Worth area. Others can be found in Houston and Austin, Texas, Denver, Seattle, San Antonio, Arlington, Virginia; Richmond, Virginia; and Norcross, Georgia. There are also churches named after individual saints, such as St. Philippe Minh Church in Saint Boniface, Manitoba.

The Nguyen Campaign against Catholicism in the 19th century
The Catholic Church in Vietnam was devastated during the Tây Sơn rebellion in the late 18th century. During the turmoil, the missions revived, however, as a result of cooperation between the French Vicar Apostolic Pigneaux de Behaine and Nguyen Anh. After Nguyen's victory in 1802, in gratitude to assistance received, he ensured protection to missionary activities. However, only a few years into the new emperor's reign, there was growing antipathy among officials against Catholicism and missionaries reported that it was purely for political reasons that their presence was tolerated. Tolerance continued until the death of the emperor and the new emperor Minh Mang succeeding to the throne in 1820.

Converts began to be harassed without official edicts in the late 1820s, by local governments. In 1831, the emperor passed new laws on regulations for religious groupings in Viet Nam, and Catholicism was then officially prohibited. In 1832, the first act occurred in a largely Catholic village near Hue, with the entire community being incarcerated and sent into exile in Cambodia. In January 1833, a new kingdom-wide edict was passed calling on Vietnamese subjects to reject the religion of Jesus and required suspected Catholics to demonstrate their renunciation by walking on a wooden cross. Actual violence against Catholics, however, did not occur until the Lê Văn Khôi revolt.

During the rebellion, a young French missionary priest named Joseph Marchand was living in sickness in the rebel Gia Dinh citadel. In October 1833, an officer of the emperor reported to the court that a foreign Christian religious leader was present in the citadel. This news was used to justify the edicts against Catholicism, and led to the first executions of missionaries in over 40 years. The first executed was named Francois Gagelin. Marchand was captured and executed as a "rebel leader" in 1835, he was put to death by "slicing". Further repressive measures were introduced in the wake of this episode in 1836. Prior to 1836, village heads had only to simply report to local mandarins about how their subjects had recanted Catholicism; after 1836, officials could visit villages and force all the villagers to line up one by one to trample on a cross and if a community was suspected of harbouring a missionary, militia could block off the village gates and perform a rigorous search; if a missionary was found, collective punishment could be meted out to the entire community.

Missionaries and Catholic communities were able to sometimes escape this through bribery of officials; they were also sometimes victims of extortion attempts by people who demanded money under the threat that they would report the villages and missionaries to the authorities. The missionary Father Pierre Duclos said:

with gold bars murder and theft blossom among honest people.

The court became more aware of the problem of the failure to enforce the laws and applied greater pressure on its officials to act; officials that failed to act or those tho who were seen to be acting too slowly were demoted or removed from office (and sometimes were given severe corporal punishment), while those who attacked and killed the Christians could receive promotion or other rewards. Lower officials or younger family members of officials were sometimes tasked with secretly going through villages to report on hidden missionaries or Catholics that had not apostasized.

The first missionary arrested during this (and later executed) was the priest Jean-Charles Cornay in 1837. A military campaign was conducted in Nam Dinh after letters were discovered in a shipwrecked vessel bound for Macao. Quang Tri and Quang Binh officials captured several priests along with the French missionary Bishop Pierre Dumoulin-Borie in 1838 (who was executed). The court translator, Francois Jaccard, a Catholic who had been kept as a prisoner for years and was extremely valuable to the court, was executed in late 1838; the official who was tasked with this execution, however, was almost immediately dismissed.

A priest, Father Ignatius Delgado, was captured in the village of Can Lao (Nam Định Province), put in a cage on public display for ridicule and abuse, and died of hunger and exposure while waiting for execution;  the officer and soldiers that captured him were greatly rewarded (about 3 kg of silver was distributed out to all of them), as were the villagers that had helped to turn him over to the authorities. The bishop Dominic Henares was found in Giao Thuy district of Nam Dinh (later executed); the villagers and soldiers that participated in his arrest were also greatly rewarded (about 3 kg of silver distributed). The priest, Father Joseph Fernandez, and a local priest, Nguyen Ba Tuan, were captured in Kim Song, Nam Dinh; the provincial officials were promoted, the peasants who turned them over were given about 3 kg of silver and other rewards were distributed. In July 1838, a demoted governor attempting to win back his place did so successfully by capturing the priest Father Dang Dinh Vien in Yen Dung, Bac Ninh province. (Vien was executed). In 1839, the same official captured two more priests: Father Dinh Viet Du and Father Nguyen Van Xuyen (also both executed).

In Nhu Ly near Hue, an elderly Catholic doctor named Simon Hoa was captured and executed. He had been sheltering a missionary named Charles Delamotte, whom the villagers had pleaded with him to send away. The village was also supposed to erect a shrine for the state-cult, which the doctor also opposed. His status and age protected him from being arrested until 1840, when he was put on trial and the judge pleaded (due to his status in Vietnamese society as both an elder and a doctor) with him to publicly recant; when he refused he was publicly executed.

A peculiar episode occurred in late 1839, when a village in Quang Ngai province called Phuoc Lam was victimized by four men who extorted cash from the villagers under threat of reporting the Christian presence to the authorities. The governor of the province had a Catholic nephew who told him about what happened, and the governor then found the four men (caught smoking opium) and had two executed as well as two exiled. When a Catholic lay leader then came to the governor to offer their gratitude (thus perhaps exposing what the governor had done), the governor told him that those who had come to die for their religion should now prepare themselves and leave something for their wives and children; when news of the whole episode came out, the governor was removed from office for incompetence.

Many officials preferred to avoid execution because of the threat to social order and harmony it represented, and resorted to use of threats or torture in order to force Catholics to recant. Many villagers were executed alongside priests according to mission reports. The emperor died in 1841, and this offered respite for Catholics. However, some persecution still continued after the new emperor took office. Catholic villages were forced to build shrines to the state cult. The missionary Father Pierre Duclos (quoted above) died in prison in after being captured on the Saigon river in June 1846. The boat he was traveling in, unfortunately contained the money that was set for the annual bribes of various officials (up to 1/3 of the annual donated French mission budget for Cochinchina was officially allocated to 'special needs') in order to prevent more arrests and persecutions of the converts; therefore, after his arrest, the officials then began wide searches and cracked down on the Catholic communities in their jurisdictions. The amount of money that the French mission societies were able to raise made the missionaries a lucrative target for officials that wanted cash, which could even surpass what the imperial court was offering in rewards. This created a cycle of extortion and bribery which lasted for years.

List of Vietnamese Martyrs
Those whose names are known are listed below:

Please keep in mind that these are the anglicized versions of their names

 Andrew Dung-Lac An Tran, Vietnamese priest
 Andrew Thong Kim Nguyen, layman
 Andrew Trong Van Tran, layman and soldier
 Andrew Tuong Manh Nguyen, layman
 Anthony Dich Tien Nguyen, layman
 Anthony Quynh Huu Nguyen, layman and doctor
 Agnes Thanh-De Thi Le, laywoman
 Augustine Schoeffler Dong, MEP, French priest
 Augustine Huy Viet Phan, layman and soldier
 Augustine Moi Van Nguyen, layman
 Bernard Due Van Vu, Vietnamese priest
 Celement Ignatius Delgado Y, OP, Spanish bishop
 Dominic Cam Van Nguyen, Vietnamese priest
 Dominic Dat Dinh, layman and soldier
 Dominic Hanh Van Nguyen, OP, Vietnamese priest
 Dominic Henares Minh, Spanish bishop
 Dominic Huyen Van Tran, layman and fisherman
 Dominic Kham Trong Pham, layman and local judge
 Dominic Mau Duc Dinh, Vietnamese priest
 Dominic Mao Duc Nguyen, layman
 Dominic Nhi Duc Nguyen, layman
 Dominic Ninh Duy Tran, layman
 Dominic Nguyen Huy Nguyen, layman
 Dominic Toai Van Tran, layman and fisherman
 Dominic Trach-Doai Duc Vu, OP, Vietnamese priest
 Dominic Tuoc Dinh Vu, OP, Vietnamese priest
 Dominic Uy Van Bui, catechist
 Dominic Xuyen Van Nguyen, OP, Vietnamese priest
 Emmanuel Phung Van Le, layman
 Emmanuel Trieu Van Nguyen, Vietnamese priest
 Francis Chieu Van Do, catechist
 Francis Gil de Frederich Te, OP, Spanish priest 
 Francis Isidore Gagelin Kinh, MEP, French priest
 Francis Jaccard Phan, MEP, French priest
 Francis Trung Van Tran, layman and military officer
 Francis Xavier Can Nguyen, catechist
 Francis Xavier Mau Trong Ha, catechist
 Hyacinth Casteñeda Gia, OP, Spanish priest
 James Nam Mai Do, Vietnamese priest
 Jerome Hermosilla Vong, OP, Spanish bishop
 John Charles Cornay Tan, MEP, French priest
 John Dat Viet Doan, Vietnamese priest
 John Hoan Trinh Doan, Vietnamese priest
 John Louis Bonnard Huong, MEP, French priest
 John Baptist Con Ngoc Tran, layman
 John Baptist Thanh Van Dinh, catechist
 Joseph Mary Díaz Sanjurjo An, OP, Spanish bishop
 Joseph Canh Luong Hoang, layman and doctor
 Joseph Fernandez Hien, OP, Spanish priest
 Joseph Hien Quang Do, Vietnamese priest
 Joseph Khang Duy Nguyen, catechist
 Joseph Luu Van Nguyen, layman
 Joseph Marchand Du, MEP, French priest
 Joseph Nghi-Kim Dinh Nguyen, Vietnamese priest
 Joseph Thi Dang Le, layman and military officer
 Joseph Uyen Dinh Nguyen, Vietnamese priest
 Joseph Vien Dinh Dang, Vietnamese priest
 Joseph Ta Trong Pham, layman and governor
 Joseph Tuc Quang Pham, layman
 Joseph Tuan Van Tran, OP, Vietnamese priest
 Joseph Tuan Van Tran, layman
 Lawrence Ngon Viet Pham, layman and soldier
 Lawrence Huong Van Nguyen, Vietnamese priest
 Luke Loan Ba Vu, Vietnamese priest
 Luke Thin Trong Pham, layman and governor
 Martin Tho Ngoc Tran, layman
 Martin Thinh Duc Ta, Vietnamese priest
 Matthew Alonzo Leciniana Dau, OP, Spanish priest
 Matthew Phuong-Dac Van Nguyen, layman
 Matthew Gam Van Le, layman and merchant
 Melchior García Sampedro Xuyen, OP, Spanish bishop
 Michael Hy Dinh Ho, layman and court mandarin
 Michael My Huy Nguyen, layman
 Nicholas The Duc Bui, layman and soldier
 Paul Buong Viet Tong, layman and military officer
 Paul Duong-Dong Van Vu, layman
 Paul Hanh Van Tran, layman
 Paul Khoan Khac Pham, Vietnamese priest
 Paul Loc Van Le, Vietnamese priest
 Paul My Van Nguyen, catechist
 Paul Ngan Nguyen, Vietnamese priest
 Paul Tinh Bao Le, Vietnamese priest
 Peter Almató Binh, OP, Spanish priest
 Peter Thuan Van Dinh, layman 
 Peter Dung Van Dinh, layman
 Peter Da Huu Phan, layman and carpenter
 Peter Dumoulin-Borie Cao, MEP, French bishop
 Peter Duong Van Truong, catechist
 Peter Francis Néron Bac, MEP, French priest
 Peter Hieu Van Nguyen, catechist
 Peter Khanh Hoang, Vietnamese priest
 Peter Khoa Dang Vu, Vietnamese priest
 Peter Luu Van Nguyen, Vietnamese priest
 Peter Qui Cong Doan, Vietnamese priest
 Peter Thi Van Truong, Vietnamese priest
 Peter Truat Van Vu, catechist
 Peter Tu Van Nguyen, OP, Vietnamese priest
 Peter Tu Khac Nguyen, catechist
 Peter Tuan Ba Nguyen, Vietnamese priest
 Peter Tuy Le, Vietnamese priest
 Peter Van Van Doan/John Baptist Van Van Bach, catechist
 Philip Minh Van Phan, Vietnamese priest
 Simon Hoa Dac Phan, layman and doctor
 Stephen Theodore Cuenot The, MEP, French bishop
 Stephen Vinh Van Nguyen, layman
 Theophanes Vénard Ven, MEP, French priest
 Thomas De Van Nguyen, layman
 Thomas Du Viet Dinh, Vietnamese priest
 Thomas Thien Van Tran, seminarian
 Thomas Toan Dinh Dao, catechist
 Thomas Khuong Tuc Ngo, Vietnamese priest
 Valentine Berriochoa Vinh, OP, Spanish bishop
 Vincent Phạm Hiếu Liêm (Vicente Liêm de la Paz), OP, Vietnamese priest
 Vincent Duong Van Pham, layman
 Vincent Diem The Nguyen, Vietnamese priest
 Vincent Tuong Manh Nguyen, layman and local judge
 Vincent Yen Do, OP, Vietnamese priest

Causes being promoted
 Andrew of Phú Yên, Jesuit missionary
 François Xavier Truong Buu Diep
 Marcel Nguyễn Tân Văn, C.Ss.R., Servant of God
 Phanxicô Xaviê Nguyễn Văn Thuận,  Cardinal

See also
 Roman Catholicism in Vietnam
 Vietnamese Martyrs, patron saint archive

Notes

References
 Les Missions Etrangères. Trois siecles et demi d'histoire et d'aventure en Asie, Editions Perrin, 2008, 
 St. Andrew Dung-Lac & Martyrs, by Father Robert F. McNamara, Saints Alive and All God's Children Copyright 1980–2010 Rev. Robert F. McNamara and St. Thomas the Apostle Church.
 Vietnamese Martyr Teaches Quiet Lessons, by Judy Ball, an AmericanCatholic.org Web site from the Franciscans and St. Anthony Messenger Press.

External links 
 
 "Saints and Blesseds of Vietnam" at GCatholic

 

 

Canonizations by Pope John Paul II
Catholic martyrs
Executed Vietnamese people
History of Catholicism in Vietnam
Lists of Christian martyrs
Lists of saints
Martyrs
Martyred groups
Beatifications by Pope Leo XIII
Beatifications by Pope Pius X
Beatifications by Pope Pius XII
Victims of anti-Catholic violence in Vietnam